is a private junior college in Setagaya, Tokyo, Japan. It was established in 1950.

See also
 Showa Women's University
 List of junior colleges in Japan

External links
  

Japanese junior colleges
Universities and colleges in Tokyo
Showa Women's University